Revenge of Itzik Finkelstein (translit. Nikmato Shel Itzik Finkelstein) is a 1993 Israeli fantasy comedy film directed by Enrique Rottenberg. It stars Moshe Ivgy, Estevan Gotfreed, Dvora Halter-Keidar and Shmil Ben Ari. Critically acclaimed, it won the Ophir Award for Best Film. The film was selected as the Israeli entry for the Best Foreign Language Film at the 66th Academy Awards, but was not accepted as a nominee.

See also
 List of submissions to the 66th Academy Awards for Best Foreign Language Film
 List of Israeli submissions for the Academy Award for Best Foreign Language Film

References

External links 
 

1993 films
1990s science fiction comedy films
Israeli science fiction comedy films
1990s fantasy comedy films
1993 comedy films